Tidass or Tiddas is a town in Khémisset Province, Rabat-Salé-Kénitra, Morocco. According to the 2004 census it has a population of 3584.

References

Populated places in Khémisset Province